This is a list of deep fried foods and dishes. Deep frying is a cooking method in which food is submerged in hot fat, such as cooking oil. This is normally performed with a deep fryer or chip pan, and industrially, a pressure fryer or vacuum fryer may be used. Deep frying is classified as a dry cooking method because no water is used. Due to the high temperature involved and the high heat conduction of oil,  the food is then prepared quickly.

Deep fried foods

 
 
 
 
 
 
 
 
 
 
 
 
 
 
 
 
 
 
 
 
 
 
 
 
 
 
 
 
 
 
 
 Czech Smažený sýr
 Slovakian Vyprážaný syr
 
 
 
 
 
 
 
 
 
 
  (Coxinha)
 
 
 

 
 
 
 
 
 
 
 
 
 
 
 
 
 
 
 
 
 
 
 
 
 
 
 
 
 
 
 
 
 
 
 
 
 
 
 
 
 
 
 
 
 
 
 
 
 
 
 
 
 
 
 
 
 
 
  – the Puerto Rican version
 
 
 
 
 
 
 
 
 
 
 
 
 
 
 
 
 
 
 
  – some varieties are deep fried

By main ingredient

Beef

Chicken

 
 
 
 
 
 
 
 
  (regular cashew chicken is stir-fried)
 
 
 
  – sometimes deep fried

Convenience foods and candy

Dairy products

  (also crema fritta)

Fish and seafood

Fruits and vegetables

 
 
 
 
 
 
 
 
 Keripik sanjay
 Tapioca chips
 
  – sometimes deep fried
 
 
 Corn tortilla dishes
 
 
 
  — sometimes deep fried 
 Crisp-fried onions

Potato

Pork

Tofu

 
 Agedashi dōfu
 
  - sometimes deep fried
 Tahu goreng
 Tahu sumedang

Other
Hamburger

By cuisine

Chinese cuisine

Cantonese

 Dace fish balls
 Deep-fried marinated pigeon
  (youtiao)

Japanese cuisine
 Agemono (揚げ物) – Deep-fried dishes
  – bite-sized pieces of chicken, fish, octopus, or other meat, floured and deep fried. Common izakaya (居酒屋) food, also often available in convenience stores.
  – marinated fried fish
 Korokke (croquette コロッケ) – breaded and deep-fried patties, containing either mashed potato or white sauce mixed with minced meat, vegetables or seafood. A popular everyday food.
 Kushikatsu (串カツ) – skewered meat, vegetables or seafood, breaded and deep fried
 Tempura (天ぷら) – deep-fried vegetables or seafood in a light, distinctive batter
 Tonkatsu (豚カツ) – deep-fried breaded cutlet of pork (chicken versions are called chicken katsu)
 Agedashi dofu (揚げ出し豆腐) – cubes of deep-fried silken tofu served in hot broth

Thai cuisine

See also

 Fish fry
 Fried chicken restaurant
 Fried fish
 Frietmuseum
 List of fried dough foods
 List of fried chicken dishes
 List of hors d'oeuvre
 Lists of prepared foods
 National Fried Chicken Day

References

External links

 

 
Deep fried